Revivio, Inc., was a continuous data protection company in the United States. It was acquired by Symantec for $20M on December 7, 2006, resulting in a considerable loss relative to the $55M invested in the company. The company was founded in 2001 by Michael Rowan and Kevin Rodgers and was headquartered in Lexington, Massachusetts.

References

Defunct software companies of the United States
Companies based in Lexington, Massachusetts